The Short L.17 Scylla was a British four-engined 39-seat biplane airliner designed and built by Short Brothers at the request of Imperial Airways to supplement the Handley Page H.P.42 fleet already in service after Handley Page quoted an excessive price for two additional H.P.42s. They were ordered in 1933.

Imperial Airways used the Scylla for scheduled flights from London to Paris and other European cities. Two aircraft were built, Scylla (G-ACJJ) and Syrinx (G-ACJK). Both served with the airline, until its merger into BOAC in 1939, when both were taken out of service the following year, Scylla after being wrecked and Syrinx being scrapped.

Design and development
The Scylla was a land-based development of the Short Kent (S.17) flying boat which used the Kent's flying surfaces on a new fuselage. It was an all-metal biplane with a wingspan of  powered originally by four Bristol Jupiter XFBM radial engines mounted on vertical struts between the upper and lower planes. The square-section fuselage was mounted below the lower wing while the tail had a single fin and rudder with a horizontal stabilizer mounted mid way up. The Scylla was originally fitted with a Flettner-type trim tab mounted on arms extended out from the rudder's trailing edge to reduce control forces. An experimental servo tab mounted on the trailing edge of the rudder was also tested, on G-ACJJ Scylla which led to a patent application submitted jointly by Shorts and Dudley Lloyd Parkes on 7 August 1936.

The main undercarriage had one fixed wheel on each side, mounted on three diagonally-braced struts, one to the upper and two to the lower edge of the fuselage; there was a single tailwheel. Ailerons were fitted to both upper and lower wings.

The engine nacelles were designed to receive Bristol Jupiter, Pegasus or Perseus engines without modification, This later enabled the two inboard Jupiters of G-ACJK Syrinx to be easily replaced with Perseus IIL sleeve valve engines, to test their performance in airline conditions. Syrinx was fitted with four Pegasus XC engines when it was rebuilt after it had been severely damaged when blown over by crosswinds while taxiing at Brussels airport.

Operators

Imperial Airways

Specifications

See also

References

Notes

Bibliography
 
 

 
 
 

1930s British airliners
Biplanes
Short Brothers aircraft
Four-engined tractor aircraft
Aircraft first flown in 1934
Four-engined piston aircraft